Wolfowitz Doctrine is an unofficial name given to the initial version of the Defense Planning Guidance for the 1994–1999 fiscal years (dated February 18, 1992) published by U.S. Under Secretary of Defense for Policy Paul Wolfowitz and his deputy Scooter Libby. Not intended for public release, it was leaked to the New York Times on March 7, 1992, and sparked a public controversy about U.S. foreign and defense policy.  The document was widely criticized as imperialist, as the document outlined a policy of unilateralism and pre-emptive military action to suppress potential threats from other nations and prevent dictatorships from rising to superpower status.

Such was the outcry that the document was hastily re-written under the close supervision of U.S. Secretary of Defense Dick Cheney and Chairman of the Joint Chiefs of Staff Colin Powell before being officially released on April 16, 1992. Many of its tenets re-emerged in the Bush Doctrine, which was described by Senator Edward M. Kennedy as "a call for 21st century American imperialism that no other nation can or should accept."

Wolfowitz was ultimately responsible for the Defense Planning Guidance, as it was released through his office and was reflective of his overall outlook. The task of preparing the document fell to Libby, who delegated the process of writing the new strategy to Zalmay Khalilzad, a member of Libby's staff and longtime aide to Wolfowitz. In the initial phase of drafting the document, Khalilzad solicited the opinions of a wide cross-section of Pentagon insiders and outsiders, including Andrew Marshall, Richard Perle, and Wolfowitz's University of Chicago mentor, the nuclear strategist Albert Wohlstetter. Completing the draft in March 1992, Khalilzad requested permission from Libby to circulate it to other officials within the Pentagon. Libby assented and within three days Khalilzad's draft was released to the New York Times by "an official who believed this post-cold war strategy debate should be carried out in the public domain."

Doctrine articles

Superpower status 
The doctrine announces the U.S.'s status as the world's only remaining superpower following the collapse of the Soviet Union at the end of the Cold War and proclaims its main objective to be retaining that status.

This was substantially re-written in the April 16 release.

U.S. primacy 
The doctrine establishes the U.S.'s leadership role within the new world order.

This was substantially re-written in the April 16 release.

Unilateralism 
The doctrine downplays the value of international coalitions.

This was re-written with a change in emphasis in the April 16 release.

Preventive Intervention 
The doctrine stated the U.S's right to intervene when and where it believed necessary.

This was softened slightly in the April 16 release.

Russian threat 
The doctrine highlighted the possible threat posed by a resurgent Russia.

This was removed from the April 16 release in favour of a more diplomatic approach.

Middle East and Southwest Asia 
The doctrine clarified the overall objectives in the Middle East and Southwest Asia.

The April 16 release was more circumspect and it reaffirmed U.S. commitments to Israel as well as its Arab allies.

See also 
 Bush Doctrine
 A Clean Break: A New Strategy for Securing the Realm

References

Bibliography 

 
  Gaddis's essay is reprinted in Paul Bolt, Damon V. Coletta and Collins G. Shackleford Jr., eds., (2005), American Defense Policy (8th ed.), Baltimore, MD: Johns Hopkins University Press.

External links 

 Defense Policy Guidance 1992–1994
 The Making of the Cheney Regional Defense Strategy, 1991-1992 at National Security Archive
 Patrick Tyler. U.S. Strategy Plan Calls for Insuring No Rivals Develop: A One-Superpower World, New York Times, March 8, 1992.
 David Armstrong. Drafting a plan for global dominance, Harper's Magazine, October 2002.
 Interview with Barton Gellman on 1992 Defense Policy Guidance - PBS
 David Yost. Dissuasion and Allies, Strategic Insights, February 2005.

Foreign policy doctrines of the United States
1992 in the United States
1992 in international relations
Presidency of George H. W. Bush